Mosdós is a village in Somogy county, Hungary.

The settlement is part of the Balatonboglár wine region.

External links 
 Street map

References 

Populated places in Somogy County